Menelik I  (Ge'ez: ምኒልክ, Mənilək) was the claimed first Emperor of Ethiopia. According to Kebra Nagast, a 14th-century national epic, in the 10th century BC he is said to have inaugurated the Solomonic dynasty of Ethiopia, so named because Menelik I was the son of the biblical King Solomon of ancient Israel and of Makeda, the Queen of Sheba.

Life 
He was conceived when his father Solomon tricked his visiting mother, the Queen of Sheba, into sleeping with him. His mother raised him as a Jew in her homeland and he only traveled to Jerusalem to meet his father for the first time when he was in his twenties. While his father begged Menelik to stay and rule over Israel, Menelik told him that he wanted to return home. Thus, Solomon sent many Israelites with him, to aid him in ruling according to biblical standards; which were aggrieved at being exiled forever. One recount is that King Solomon gave his Ark of the Covenant to his son as a gift, while another states Solomon attemped to regain the ark but was unable to due to its supernatural properties aiding Menelik. Upon the death of his mother, or upon her abdication in his favor, Menelik was crowned King of Ethiopia.

According to one Ethiopian tradition, Menelik was born at Mai-Bela near the village of Addi-Shmagle, located north west of Asmara, in Eritrea.

Dynasty 
According to legend, Menelik I founded the Solomonic dynasty of Ethiopia that ruled Ethiopia with few interruptions for close to three thousand years. This ended 225 generations later, with the deposition of Emperor Haile Selassie in 1974. However, historical records show that the Solomonic dynasty began in 1262 AD, when Yekuno Amlak, who claimed descent from biblical Solomon and Sheba, overthrew the last ruler of the Zagwe dynasty, dismissing them as not of "the house of Israel" (i.e., of Solomon). and established the Solomonic Dynasty in 1270 AD. Acts 8:26–40 depicts a 1st century account of an Ethiopian royal official on a pilgrimage to Jerusalem from Ethiopia.

Popular culture 
Much tourist art in Ethiopia depicts the narrative about Menelik I in a series of panels, 44 scenes, eleven for each of four lines. The story depicted on them is the oral version (beginning with a backstory on Sheba and including an Ethiopian maid who also becomes pregnant by Solomon), not the medieval text version.

2004 short documentary, Menelik I, was filmed in Ethiopia. It tells the story of the son of the Queen of Sheba through tableau images and music.

See also 
 Menelik II of Ethiopia
 Ark of the Covenant
 Kebra Negast
 List of legendary monarchs of Ethiopia

Notes

References 

10th-century BCE Hebrew people
10th-century BC rulers
Emperors of Ethiopia
Ethiopian Jews
Jewish monarchs
Jewish royalty
People whose existence is disputed
Solomon
Solomonic dynasty